Fluoroacetone is an organofluorine compound with the chemical formula . In contrast to trifluoroacetone, the compound has one fluorine atom. Under normal conditions, the substance is a colorless liquid. Fluoroacetone is also a highly toxic and flammable compound. Fumes of fluoroacetone can form an explosive mixture with air.

Synthesis
Fluoroacetone can be obtained by a reaction of triethylamine trihydrofluoride with bromoacetone.

Applications
Fluoroacetone is used as a catalyst to study the kinetics of the ketone-catalysed decomposition of peroxymonosulfuric acid (Caro's acid). It is also a precursor material for the production of higher fluoroketones.

Fluoroacetone has not been used as a lachrymatory substance in contrast to other halogenated acetone derivatives, such as bromoacetone or chloroacetone.

See also
Bromoacetone
Chloroacetone
Iodoacetone
Thioacetone

References

Organofluorides
Ketones
Lachrymatory agents